Operation Muharram (Persian: عملیات محرم) was an Iranian operation which was conducted during the Iran–Iraq War by the command of Hasan Bagheri. It was started on 1 November 1982 at 22:08 o'clock with the code of "La-Hawla wa La-Qowwatah Ela Bellah; Ya Zeinab-Kobra (S)". The goal of this operation was "liberation of Iran's occupied lands in the vicinity of frontier mountains of Jabal-al-Hamrain in the south of Dehloran and the region which was between Fakkeh till Dehloran city.

Operation Muharram is known as one of exterritorial operations of Iran, too; because, advance in the territory of Iraq was planned as well as liberation plan of Iran's occupied lands. Operational area of Muharram was limited from the east to Doyrej river, and from the west to the frontier highlands of Jabal-al-Hamrain and Jabal-al-Fuqi. The operation was regarded as the continuation of Operation Fath ol-Mobin that could complete its goals by winning in that.

Finally, at the end of Operation Muharram, Iran succeeded to free the highlands 400/298, Bayat oil territory, Anbar river, Chamsari police station, Musian and other returns, among freeing 550 kilometers of Iran's lands, capturing 2350 Iraqis, and 6000 Iraqis were killed/injured, plus other casualties to Iraqi Army.

See also 
 Operation Ramadan
 Operation Ashura (Iran)

References 

Ramadan
Iran–Iraq War